Miles Armstrong (born 16 April 1986) is a retired Australian tennis player. He now teaches at a regional school in Western Australia.

Armstrong has a career high ATP singles ranking of 268 achieved on 8 September 2008. He also has a career high doubles ranking of 318 achieved on 19 October 2009. Armstrong has won 1 ATP Challenger doubles title at the 2009 McDonald's Burnie International.

Tour titles

Doubles

External links
 
 

1986 births
Living people
Australian male tennis players
Place of birth missing (living people)
21st-century Australian people